Lak Kak Yi (born 10 May 1996) is a Hong Kong professional footballer who currently plays as a midfielder for Hong Kong Premier League club Sham Shui Po.

Club career
On 20 October 2020, Lai was named as one of the 17 new players for Pegasus.

He left Pegasus in 2021.

References

External links
HKFA

1996 births
Living people
Hong Kong footballers
Association football midfielders
Happy Valley AA players
Yuen Long FC players
TSW Pegasus FC players
Sham Shui Po SA players
Hong Kong Premier League players
Hong Kong First Division League players
Alumni of the University of Hong Kong